Well Told Story is a communications research and production company active in Kenya and Tanzania and based in Nairobi, Kenya. It is best known as the producer of the multimedia youth communications platform Shujaaz.

Well Told Story has received several international media awards for innovation in multimedia storytelling including two International Emmy Awards in 2012 and 2014 and a One World Media Award in 2011 for Shujaaz, as well as an International Emmy Award Nomination and a One World Media Award in 2013 for "JongoLove", a story told in Kenya across FM radio, YouTube, SMS and Facebook.

References 

 Article in Kenya's The Star newspaper Shujaaz youth engagement wins Emmy
 The International Emmy Awards
 Partner organisation Twaweza 
 Research Into Use partner programme
 Article in The Economist: Kenya and Charles Dickens
 Article on the UK's Department for International Development website
 Artcicle in The New Republic website Kenyan Comic Book Transforming Education
 Article in The Guardian Kenya's youth encouraged to aspire by DJB and the Shujaaz.fm comic book

Companies based in Nairobi